Burutay Subaşı (born 15 July 1990) is a Turkish male volleyball player. On club level he plays for Galatasaray.

Career
Born in Çanakkale, Subaşı started playing volleyball at SSK Sports Club in 2001.

Galatasaray
On 26 April 2021, Galatasaray renewed a 1-year contract with experienced spiker Subaşı.

National team career
He is part of the Turkey men's national volleyball team.

Sporting achievements

Clubs

National championships
 2015–16  Turkish SuperCup 2015, with Halkbank Ankara
 2015–16  Turkish Championship, with Halkbank Ankara

References

External links
Player profile at Galatasaray.org
Player profile at Volleybox.net
Profile at FIVB.org
 

1990 births
Living people
Turkish men's volleyball players
Place of birth missing (living people)
Volleyball players at the 2015 European Games
European Games competitors for Turkey
Halkbank volleyball players
Galatasaray S.K. (men's volleyball) players
Arkas Spor volleyball players
21st-century Turkish people